This Is the New That is the fourth album by American singer-songwriter Jonathan Byrd.  It was officially released on March 21, 2007, although it's online availability began in late December 2006. While Byrd's earlier recordings have been in more of a traditional folk vein ranging at times from bluegrass to world music, this release places Byrd's song craft in somewhat more of a rock setting.  According to Byrd, some of his diverse influences here include Bob Dylan, Anaïs Mitchell, The Beatles & Merle Haggard.

Byrd is joined by a number of musicians. Collaborators from his previous disc, Rob McMaken and Andrew Reissiger of the Athens, Georgia-based world music duo, Dromedary join him again on this recording, however, this time they bring in amped up electric guitars rather than their usual assortment of exotic instruments.

Mastering of the CD was completed in early October 2006, and tracks from the disc began receiving its first U.S. airplay later that month. Also, the track, "The Cocaine Kid" received airplay in Europe as early as January 2007.

Track listing 
 "The Cocaine Kid"
 "Colleen"
 "Jesus was a Bootlegger"
 "Hank"
 "Sexy Jessie"
 "Austin Women"
 "The Cold & Hungry Night"
 "Learn to Rock 'n' Roll"
 "Amelia, My Dream"
 "I Want You"
 "The Bishop & The Ghost of the Nazarene"
 "Jacks"

Credits 
Musicians:
 Jonathan Byrd – guitar & vocals
 Rob McMaken – electric guitar & vocals
 Andrew Reissiger – electric guitar
 Jeff Reilly – drums
 Neal Fountain – bass & lap steel
 Will McFarlane – electric guitar
 Mary Moss – vocals

Production:
 Mastering – Bob Klotz Audio Productions, Port Matilda, Pennsylvania

Notes and sources 

Jonathan Byrd (musician) albums
2007 albums